Echinus is a genus of sea urchins.

Species
Species in this genus include:

Fossils
 Echinus coglesi  
 Echinus dixoni  
 Echinus etheridgei 
 Echinus lamarcki 
 Echinus multicostatus  
 Echinus nodulosus 
 Echinus paucimiliaris  
 Echinus sphaeroides 
 Echinus woodi

References